BlueSci is the oldest of Cambridge University's student-run science magazines. It has been published continuously since 2004. It is published at the beginning of each term during the University of Cambridge's academic year. BlueSci'''s editors are voluntary and not paid, and typically appointed on a yearly basis. They are supported by a permanent member, the Senior Treasurer Dr Björn Haßler, the founding president of Cambridge University Science Productions. BlueSci was originally published as an activity of Cambridge University Science Productions. Over the following two years BlueSci became the more recognised brand, and for Issue 11 BlueSci was adopted as the overall name for the society.

Production of the magazine is currently based at the CUSU Offices on the New Museums Site. Previously, they were based in the Varsity'' premises for over 10 years. The move to the new offices occurred in April 2014.

References

External links

 Centre for Science and Policy (BlueSci)
BlueSci Podcast

Biannual magazines published in the United Kingdom
Magazines established in 2004
Mass media in Cambridge
Publications associated with the University of Cambridge
Science and technology in Cambridgeshire
Science and technology magazines published in the United Kingdom
Student magazines published in the United Kingdom